This is a list of number-one songs in the United States during the year 1950 according to Billboard magazine.  Prior to the creation of the Billboard Hot 100, Billboard published multiple singles charts each week.  In 1950, the following three charts were produced:

Best Sellers in Stores – ranked the biggest selling singles in retail stores, as reported by merchants surveyed throughout the country.
Most Played by Jockeys – ranked the most played songs on United States radio stations, as reported by radio disc jockeys and radio stations.
Most Played in Jukeboxes – ranked the most played songs in jukeboxes across the United States.

See also
1950 in music

1950
United States Billboard Singles